Ré Soupault (29 October 1901–12 March 1996) born known as Meta Erna Niemeyer, was a French-German artist, educated at the Bauhaus. She is known for a diversity of artistic works as a photographer, fashion designer, and also as translator.

Education and early life 
She was born in Pommerania in the then German town (present-day Polish) of Bublitz in 1901. In 1921, she began to study at the Bauhaus in Weimar. There, she became influenced by Johannes Itten, whose colours and shape theory would influence her early work. Soupault was impressed by the Neo-Zoroastrian Mazdaznanism, according to which Itten and other Bauhaus members lived, and studied Sanskrit for two semesters at Jena university. In the Bauhaus, Erna became known as Ré, as Kurt Schwitters and the photographer Otto Umbehr used to call her.

Career

Berlin
During a visit to Berlin, she met the former Bauhaus member Werner Graeff, who introduced her to the Swedish experimental filmmaker Viking Eggeling. After her participation in the first major Bauhaus exhibition in Weimar in 1923, Niemeyer became Eggeling's assistant. She was fascinated by Eggeling's enthusiasm and finished the film “Diagonal Symphony” for the sick filmmaker within a year. With Schwitters, she developed a close working relationship and together they moved to Hanover. As the Bauhaus moved to Dessau in 1925 and developed a more functional design, she decided not to return and to settle in Berlin instead.

Paris 
Having begun to write under the pen name "Greta Green" for the Sport im Bild magazine in Germany, she moved to Paris as a correspondent for the Scherl Verlag in 1929. She quickly established herself in avant-gardist circles in Montparnasse where artists met in the Café Dôme. At a birthday party for Kiki de Montparnasse, she got to know the millionaire Arthur Wheeler, with whom she opened the fashion boutique Ré Sport in 1931. She had designed fashion before, like modern culottes for the Parisian Paul Poiret. Later, she designed and sold "rational clothing for the working woman", and some of her collections were photographed by Man Ray. When Wheeler died in 1934, she had to close the fashion studio. In 1933, she got to know her second husband Phillippe Soupault, a French poet and journalist. With him, she travelled through Europe and took photographs for his reports.

Personal life 
At the Bauhaus, she got to know her first husband Hans Richter in 1922 with whom she got married in 1926. The couple befriended architect Mies van der Rohe, painter Fernand Leger and composer Paul Hindemith amongst others. In 1927, the marriage with Richter broke and by 1931 they divorced.  Her second husband was Phillippe Soupault, who she got to know at a reception at the Russian Embassy in Paris in November 1933 and married in 1937.

Between 1938 and 1943, the couple lived in Tunisia, where Phillippe Soupault established the anti-Fascist Radio Tunis, speaking out against the Italian Radio Bari. Following the arrest of Phillippe in March 1942 by German troops in Tunis, they fled to New York in 1943. In the following years, the couple travelled through South America for the Agence France-Press. After their return to the United States, Ré and Phillippe Souplault separated, and he returned to Paris.

Later life 
Having returned to Paris in 1955, she began to work as a translator and in 1948, she was commissioned by the German publisher Büchergilde Gutenberg to translate the diaries of the French author Romain Rolland. Further, she translated the collected works of Comte de Lautrémont. She stayed in contact with Phillipp Soupault, with whom she jointly produced a film about painter Wassily Kandinsky in 1967. In 1973, Phillippe and Ré decided to live together again. This time, each in their own apartment, but in the same house. Phillippe Soupault died in 1990.

References 

1901 births
1996 deaths
People from Pomerania
Avant-garde art
German photographers
German women journalists
Bauhaus alumni
German emigrants to France